Racova is a commune in Bacău County, Western Moldavia, Romania. It is composed of four villages: Gura Văii, Hălmăcioaia, Ilieși and Racova.

References

External links
 Official site

Communes in Bacău County
Localities in Western Moldavia